Tecwyn Ifan is an influential Welsh singer and songwriter from Glanamman, Carmarthenshire, Wales. He was a Baptist minister in Pembrokeshire for many years, and was a member of the group Perlau Taf during the 1960s and 1970s and, in 1972, formed a band with Cleif Harpwood, Iestyn Garlick and Phil Edwards ("Phil Small"). He is the father of Gruffudd Ifan, drummer in the band Texas Radio.

Discography 
 Y Dref Wen (Sain), 1977
 Dof Yn Ôl (Sain), 1978
 Goleuni Yn Yr Hwyr (Sain), 1979
 Edrych I’r Gorwel (Sain), 1981
 Herio’r Oriau Du (Sain), 1983
 Stesion Strata (Sain), 1990
 Y Goreuon (Sain), 1995
 Sarita (Sain), 1997
 Wybren Las (Sain), 2005
 Llwybrau Gwyn  (Sain), 2012

References

Welsh folk singers
20th-century Welsh male singers
20th-century Welsh clergy
1952 births
Living people
People from Glanamman